Chambray Touraine Handball is the name of a French handball club from Chambray-lès-Tours. This team currently competes in the French Women's Handball First League from 2016.

History of the club 
In 1994, Chambray sports club, set up a new section, Handball enriches the sports club with 1 team senior men. 2006–2007, the Chambray club set up an agreement with the women's section of the St Cyr sur Loire club. Thus, a large number of women come to join the club, with in particular the pennant team: the senior women, then evolving in National 3 under the direction of Marques Guillaume (coach). Phillipe Hualt chaired the club from 2006 to 2010. This was then taken over by Gérald Minard from 2010 to 2015. In March 2015, Yves Guérin took over as club chair and appointed Christophe Bouhour professional team manager.

Since 2014, the club has given itself the means to access the French elite by recruiting many recognized players, such as Sophie Herbrecht, Ionela Stanca-Gâlcă first, then Linda Pradel, Koumba Cissé or Ana de Sousa in the summer of 2015.

Second in the 2015–2016 season in Division 2, Chambray accedes for the first time in its history to the elite of French women's handball.

The 2016–2017 season is the club's first in the first division. After a difficult start, Chambray won the first match in its history in LFH on the eighth day at home against Brest Bretagne Handball. From then on, the promoted followed a series of nine victories in fourteen meetings allowing them to finish in sixth place in the ranking with a record of nine wins, two draws and nine losses. In the playoffs, Chambray was eliminated in the quarterfinals by Brest.

The club competed in the group stage of the 2021–22 Women's EHF European League for the first time.

Team

Current squad
Squad for the 2022–23 season

Goalkeepers
 1  Agathe Quiniou 
 12  Rikke Marie Granlund (pregnant)
 70  Emma Perche 
Wingers
LW
 13  Manon Houette 
 34  Rebecca Bossavy
RW
 22  Kimberley Bouchard
 84  Melvine Deba 
Line players
 6  Clara Monti Danielsson
 19  Aminata Sow
 82  Aidiatou Dembele

Back players
LB
 10  Lucie Modenel
 33  Jovana Stoiljković 
CB
 7  Ida Lagerbon
 27  Nadia Mielke-Offendal 
 41  Nina Brkljačić
RB
 11  Laura van der Heijden
 93  Karichma Ekoh

Transfers
Transfers for the 2022–23 season 

Joining
  Nadia Offendal (CB) (from  Paris 92)
  Laura van der Heijden (RB) (from  Borussia Dortmund Handball)
  Agathe Quiniou (GK) (from  Brest Bretagne Handball)
  Manon Houette (LW) (from  Bourg-de-Péage Drôme  Handball)
  Melvine Deba (RW) 
  Karichma Ekoh (RB) (from  Fleury Loiret Handball)

Leaving
  Alexandra Lacrabère (RB) (to  CS Rapid Bucuresti)
  Jannela Blonbou (RB) (to  Paris 92)
  Andrea Novellan (GK) (to  Handball Plan-de-Cuques)
  Djénéba Touré (LB) (to  Stella Saint-Maur Handball)
  Estel Memana (LW) (to  Brest Bretagne Handball)
  Sophia Fehri (retires)

Notable players 

  Sophie Herbrecht
  Blandine Dancette
  Linda Pradel
  Camille Aoustin
  Constance Mauny
  Stella Baudouin
  Ionela Stanca
  Nely Carla Alberto
  Ana Paula Belo
  Szimonetta Planéta
  Anouk Nieuwenweg

References

External links
 

French handball clubs
Sport in Indre-et-Loire
Handball clubs established in 2006